Lady ILE (Santa Cruz, California), is an American rapper and emcee based in Los Angeles. She released her debut EP 1st Impression in 2011, and in 2014 released "Still Turnt Up," a collaborative single with DJ Fresh. She has also collaborated as a primary artist, composer, or vocalist with artists such as Droop E, Cousin Fik, Prince Lefty, J Stalin, King Bam Bubbi, Sleyv, Stevie Joe, Planet Asia, & The Jacka. Power 106 has her songs "So Wrong" and "Awesome" in their rotation, and according to the station, "Her versatile, eclectic style has variety from soulful hip hop to mob music to what you want to hear in a club."

Early life 
Lady ILE was born on August 19, 1984 in Santa Cruz, California, where she was raised. At the age of six she started writing music and poetry, and she has been rapping and emceeing since 2007.

Music career

Early releases
Amongst Lady ILE's earliest releases was a 2006 mixtape. Her debut album, a digital EP titled 1st Impression, was produced by DJ Fresh. A single from the album, "So Wrong," was released as early as October 2011. The album itself was released on February 7, 2012 on World Records, with the five tracks including "Introducing Lady Ile," "Wtf," "So Wrong," "Interlude," and Awesome." The Los Angeles hip hop station Power 106 put her songs "So Wrong" and "Awesome" in their rotation, and according to Power 106, "Her versatile, eclectic style has variety from soulful hip hop to mob music to what you want to hear in a club."

On February 25, 2014, her collaborative single with DJ Fresh was released on the Fresh in Fresh Entertainment label. Titled "Still Turnt Up," an earlier music video for the track premiered on VEVO on January 30, 2014. The music video was filmed and edited by PJ Flores of 4 Dub Entertainment.

Recent years
Lady ILE has appeared on a number of releases by other artists. In 2008 she was featured on "Lights on Me" by Sleyv, and in 2009 she was featured on the track "Hypnotizing" by Prince Lefty. "Hypnotizing" was included on the album Planet Guap and produced by Keem Beats.

She frequently collaborates with producer DJ Fresh and periodically appears on his Tonite Show album series. In 2012 she was a featured artist on the track "I Wanna F*ck" off Cousin Fik & Dj.Fresh - The Tonite Show. That year she was also a composer and featured artist for the track "Ride For You," included on The Jacka & Dj.Fresh - The Tonite Show by The Jacka and DJ Fresh. The track featured Stevie Joe, with Lady ILE handling the choral elements.

In 2013, she was a primary artist on "Relax" off The Tonite Show Sessions Vol. 2, and in February 2014 she was featured on the track "Still Turnt Up" on DJ Fresh's album Boomin' System, a mixtape which also featured artists such as Kendrick Lamar, Droop-E, and J. Stalin. The mixtape was received positively, and a review by Complex praised the variety and unpredictability of the production styles.

She has announced an upcoming full album titled 1st Impression. Produced by DJ Fresh, it is due to be released in the spring of 2014.

Personal life
Lady ILE has a career as a professional esthetician, and she is currently located in Los Angeles.

Discography

Solo albums

Singles

Features

See also
West Coast hip hop

References

External links

Lady ILE on Facebook

1984 births
American women rappers
African-American women rappers
Living people
People from Santa Cruz, California
Rappers from California
21st-century American rappers
21st-century American women musicians
21st-century African-American women
21st-century African-American musicians
20th-century African-American people
20th-century African-American women
21st-century women rappers